The North Division Two (currently known as the 'Mowi North Division 2' for sponsorship reasons) is the fourth tier of the Shinty league system. League champions take home the MacGillivray Junior Cup and are promoted to the North Division One. 

Due to the folding of North Division Three no relegation currently takes place.

Current Teams 
The 2019 Mowi North Division 2 will consist of the following teams:

*Denotes Reserve team

Beauly Shinty Club 2nd*
Boleskine Camanachd
Inverness Shinty Club 2nd*
Kilmallie Shinty Club 2nd*
Lewis Camanachd (Comann Camanachd Leòdhais)
Lochcarron Camanachd
Strathglass Shinty Club*
Strathspey Camanachd

History

1996 to 1999: North Division Two becomes the third tier with the creation of a Premier Division.

1999 to 2006: North Division Two becomes the fourth tier of the league system with the advent of the National Division One. 

2007 to 2014: North Division Two once again becomes the third tier of Shinty

2014: North Division two returns to being the fourth tier of Shinty.

List of winners (Since 2014)

2014 - Newtonmore Camanachd Club 2nd
2015 - Skye Camanachd 2nd 
2016 - Aberdeen University Shinty Club
2017 - Glengarry Shinty Club
2018 - Lovat Shinty Club 2nd

External links
Marine Harvest North Division One

Shinty competitions